North Nahanni River is a river in the Northwest Territories of Canada. It is a major tributary of the Mackenzie River.

Course
It flows east, south of the Thundercloud Range, then turns north-east and east. It turns south around the Camsell Range of the Franklin Mountains, where it receives the waters of Deceiver Creek and Battlement Creek. It turns east after receiving the Ram River and Tetcela River and flows between the Nahanni Range and the Camsell Range.

Tributaries
From headwaters to mouth, the North nahanni River receives waters from the following tributaries:
Deceiver Creek
Battlement Creek
Ram River
Tetcela River

See also
List of rivers of the Northwest Territories

References

Rivers of the Northwest Territories
Tributaries of the Mackenzie River